Omu Dam  is a rockfill dam located in Hokkaido Prefecture in Japan. The dam is used for irrigation. The catchment area of the dam is 16.9 km2. The dam impounds about 22  ha of land when full and can store 3300 thousand cubic meters of water. The construction of the dam was started on 1989 and completed in 2009.

References

Dams in Hokkaido